Warren A. Benfield (February 12, 1913 – July 8, 2001) was a classical double bass player. He enjoyed a long career in the bass section of the Chicago Symphony Orchestra and was professor at Northwestern University.

Studies and orchestral career
Warren Benfield was a student of Anton Torello at the Curtis Institute in Philadelphia.

Benfield joined the bass section of the Minneapolis Symphony, becoming its youngest member in 1934. He also played as principal bass in the Saint Louis Symphony Orchestra before joining the Philadelphia Orchestra in 1942. He played for a short while as co-principal, sharing the position with fellow Torello pupil Roger Scott, before being appointed principal bass of the Chicago Symphony Orchestra by Rafael Kubelik in 1949. Kubelik's presence in Chicago was not a long one, and Benfield was eventually fired, forcing him to audition for the orchestra. He continued to play in the Chicago Symphony until his retirement in 1987.

Teaching
Warren Benfield taught for many years at Northwestern University in Evanston, IL. He built a reputation there as one of the leading double bass teachers of his time. Some prominent bassists who studied with Warren include Harold Robinson, Rufus Reid and Jeff Bradetich. He also taught at DePaul University in Chicago.

Warren Benfield wrote, with the help of James Seay Dean jr., The Art of Double Bass Playing- a text which outlines many important qualities required of the double bassist in ensemble and solo playing as well as showing, if not expertise, appreciation for players in Jazz and contemporary classical fields. While not a bass method, The Art of the Double Bass includes numerous passages from orchestral and solo repertoire; it refers to these passages as they relate to the topics discussed.

See also
Anton Torello
Oscar G. Zimmerman
Jeff Bradetich
Harold Robinson

References

External links
The Art of Double Bass Playing
Bill Bentgen's Website
 list of Philadelphia Orchestra bass section members.

1913 births
American classical musicians
American classical double-bassists
Male double-bassists
2001 deaths
Northwestern University faculty
DePaul University faculty
Curtis Institute of Music alumni
20th-century American musicians
20th-century classical musicians
20th-century double-bassists
20th-century American male musicians